The following are the football (soccer) events of the year 1931 throughout the world.

Events

Winners club national championship 
 Argentina: Boca Juniors
 Belgium: R. Antwerp F.C.
 England: Arsenal F.C.
 Greece: Olympiacos
 Hungary: Újpest FC
 Iceland: KR
 Ireland: 
League of Ireland: Shelbourne
 Italy: Juventus
 Netherlands: Ajax Amsterdam
 Paraguay: Olimpia Asunción
 Poland: Garbarnia Kraków
 Scotland:
Scottish Cup: Celtic
 Soviet Union: Russia
 Spain: Athletic Bilbao

International tournaments
 1931 British Home Championship (October 20, 1930 – April 22, 1931)

 Baltic Cup 1931 in Estonia (August 30 - September 1, 1931)

 1929-32 Nordic Football Championship (June 14, 1929 – September 25, 1932)1931: (May 25 - October 11, 1931)
 (1931)
 (1929-1932)

 Balkan Cup 1929-31 (October 6, 1929 – November 29, 1931)

 Balkan Cup 1931 in Bulgaria (September 30 - October 4, 1931)

Births
 January 9: Ángel Berni, Paraguayan footballer (died 2017)
 January 18: André Piters, Belgian international footballer (died 2014)
 February 9: Josef Masopust, Czechoslovak international footballer and manager (died 2015)
 February 14: Newton de Sordi, Brazilian international footballer (died 2013)
 February 16: Bobby Collins, Scottish international footballer (died 2014)
 March 1: Arne Pedersen, Norwegian international footballer (died 2013)
 May 16: Vujadin Boškov, Yugoslav international football player and coach (died 2014)
 June 13: Jean-Jacques Marcel, French international footballer (died 2014)
 June 28: Aleksandar Ivoš, Serbian footballer (died 2020)
 July 5: Gerd Lauck, German footballer (died 2005)
 August 2: Yuri Kuznetsov, Soviet international footballer (died 2016)
 August 5: Billy Bingham, Northern Irish international footballer and manager (died 2022)
 September 19: Hiroto Muraoka, Japanese football player (died 2017)
 October 13: Raymond Kopa, French international footballer (died 2017)
 November 6: Pál Várhidi, Hungarian international footballer and manager (died 2015)
 December 27: John Charles, Welsh international footballer (died 2004)

Deaths
 5 September: John Thomson, Scottish international footballer (born 1909)

References 

 
Association football by year